Geoff Clark (first ¼ 1920 – 13 November 2008) was an English professional rugby league footballer who played in the 1940s and 1950s.

Background
Geoff Clark's birth was registered in Wigton district, Cumberland, England, he worked at Yorkshire Electric Transformer Company, Brewery Lane, Thornhill Lees, for three years he was the Steward at Howley Hall Golf Club, Scotchman Lane, Morley, Leeds, he was the last surviving member of Dewsbury's 1947 Championship final team and Dewsbury's oldest ex-player, after a lengthy illness, he died aged 88 in Drighlington, West Yorkshire, his funeral took place at Dewsbury Moor Crematarium at 1pm on 20 November 2008.

Playing career
Clark won caps for England while at Dewsbury in 1949 against Other Nationalities, and in 1951 against Other Nationalities.

Genealogical information
Geoff Clark's marriage to Isabel B. (née Armstrong) (birth registered fourth ¼ 1920 in Wigton district) was registered during third ¼ 1943 in Wigton district. They had children; Patricia A. Clark (birth registered second ¼ 1947 in Dewsbury district – died 2008 (aged 60–61)), and Anthony J. "Tony" Clark (birth registered third ¼  in Dewsbury district.

References

External links
Great Names Fail To Make The Final Cut

1920 births
2008 deaths
Cumbria rugby league team players
Dewsbury Rams players
England national rugby league team players
English rugby league players
Rugby league centres
Rugby league players from Wigton
Rugby league wingers